Susan J. Lederman  is a Canadian experimental psychologist. She is a professor emerita in the Department of Psychology at Queen's University in Kingston, Ontario, Canada. She is recognized for her contributions to the field of haptics.

Lederman earned a B.A. from the University of Toronto in 1968; an M.A. from the University of Wisconsin in 1970; and a Ph.D. from the University of Toronto in 1973.

Lederman's research has examined, among other topics, the tactile psychophysics of texture perception, and the haptic processing of objects and faces. She led a research project to design and test the addition of a tactile feature to Canadian banknotes, in order to increase their accessibility to blind and visually impaired users. She was formerly the Associate Editor-in-Chief of the IEEE journal Transactions on Haptics.

Selected works

See also 
 Canadian currency tactile feature

References 

Living people
Year of birth missing (living people)
Canadian psychologists
Canadian women psychologists
Academic staff of Queen's University at Kingston
University of Toronto alumni
University of Wisconsin–Madison alumni
Fellows of the Royal Society of Canada